The Han Kuang Exercise is the annual military exercise of the Republic of China Armed Forces in Taiwan, Penghu, Kinmen and Matsu for combat readiness in the event of an attack from the People's Liberation Army of the People's Republic of China.

Overview 
The exercise is divided into two phases, which are the Command Post Exercise (CPX) and the computer-simulated war gaming followed by Field Training Exercises (FTX).

Since at least 2017 the exercise has been fully bilingual with both Mandarin and English being used.

History

1984
The exercise was first held by Army General Hau Pei-tsun (the then Chief of the General Staff) on 23 April 1984.

2000
The 2000 exercise was held on August, focusing on anti-missile, anti-landing, anti-airborne landing and anti-air raid.

2001
The 2001 exercise was held from 26 March until 28 April.

2006
The 2006 exercise was held at the coastal area of Yilan County, attended by President Chen Shui-bian and Vice President Annette Lu and involving around 13,000 servicemen. It was the first time the Patriot-II missiles were deployed.

2008
The 2008 exercise was held on 23–27 June for the computer-simulated war gaming, while the field training exercises were held on 22–26 September.

2011
The 2011 exercise was held on 11–15 April in Taichung City and Pingtung County.

2012
In the 2012 exercise, President Ma Ying-jeou was out of Taiwan during the drill due to his diplomatic visits to three African countries, making the first time of the exercise with the absence of the president.

2013
The 2013 5-day exercise was held in April 2013 in Penghu.

2014
The 2014 exercise was held in Chiayi County and Penghu County. Civilian airplanes were used for the first time for personnel transport, carrying military officers and reservists from Kaohsiung to Penghu.

2015
The 2015 exercise consisted of two stages. The first stage was held on 4–8 May 2015, designed to test the military's combat capabilities after undergoing streamlining process end of 2014. The second stage is currently held from 7–11 September 2015 simulating attack from the People's Liberation Army. New weapon systems of Lockheed P-3 Orion marine patrol aircraft, Tuo Jiang stealth missile corvette, Pan Shi supply vessel, Cloud Leopard armored vehicle and remote-controlled aerial vehicles. The exercise is held at a military base in northern Hsinchu County.

2016

The 2016 exercise was held on 22–26 August 2016. The exercise saw the National Airborne Service Corps involved for the first time. There were in total 1,072 tests performed during the exercise.

2017

The 2017 exercise consisted of two stages. The first stage was held on 1–5 May 2017. The exercise included scenario when the People's Liberation Army (PLA) deploys three aircraft carriers, stealth aircraft and missiles. It focused on preserving combat capability using the collected information and surveillance data and countering the blockades and landings in Taiwan.

The second stage was held on 22–26 May 2017. It included simulations of attacks on Ching Chuan Kang Air Base by the PLA to test the ROC armed forces combat and defense capabilities on the coordinated response to simulated threats from the PLA. The exercise included locations such as Penghu and Taiping Island.

2018
The 2018 exercise was held on 4 June 2018 for five days. It was proceeded with computer-aided war games on 30 April to 5 May. The exercise consists of several main points, which are joint air-sea combat operation, anti-landing operations and joint anti-airborne combat operations. This exercise was also the first one to include civilian resources in its drill. On the first day of the exercise, an F-16 fighter jet with tail number 6648 went missing at 1:43 p.m. over northern Taiwan after taking off at 1:09 p.m. The aircraft was subsequently found crashed at 4:18 p.m. by fire fighters after receiving initial reports from a hiker at 3:22 p.m. The air force then ordered to temporarily grounded all of F-16 aircraft until further notice pending investigation.

2019
The 2019 exercise started with computer-aided war games between 22–26 April 2019. It then continued with live-fire drills on 27–21 May 2019. The live exercise featured the takeoff and landing exercise of the Republic of China Air Force aircraft on the Huatan section of National freeway 1 in Changhua County.

2020
The 2020 exercise saw the participation of the National Police Agency’s Thunder Squad and the Coast Guard Administration’s Special Task Unit for the first time. They participated alongside military special forces units in anti-decapitation drills.

During the 2020 exercise a Ching Chiang-class patrol ships with special electronic warfare equipment was used to interfere with the signals collection of Chinese spy ships operating off Orchid Island.

See also
 Republic of China Armed Forces
 Ministry of National Defense (Republic of China)

References

1984 establishments in Taiwan
Military exercises and wargames
Military of the Republic of China